The Breydon Bridge is a road bridge carrying the A47 in Great Yarmouth across the River Yare close to Breydon Water.  It replaces the former railway Breydon Viaduct which was closed in 1953 and demolished by 1963.

When built in 1985, the bridge was allocated the road number A12, which ran from London to Great Yarmouth via Lowestoft and Ipswich/A14, in February 2017, the A12 was reallocated the number A47 as a Southern extension of the latter road, therefore leaving the Breydon Bridge carrying the number A47 which continues to Lowestoft before terminating at the A12.

Bridges in Norfolk